Culiacancito is a small town located nearby, just northwest of the larger city of Culiacán, Sinaloa, Mexico. Footballer Jared Borgetti was born here in Culiacancito.

Populated places in Sinaloa